Face the Fear is In Strict Confidence's second studio album.

Track listing

References

External links 
 

In Strict Confidence albums
1998 albums